The Access to Medicine Index is a ranking system published biennially since 2008 by the Access to Medicine Foundation in Amsterdam, the Netherlands, an international not-for-profit organisation, funded by the Dutch Ministry of Foreign Affairs, the UK Foreign, Commonwealth, and Development Office (FCDO), the Bill & Melinda Gates Foundation, Wellcome Trust, and Axa Investment Managers. It ranks the world's 20 largest pharmaceutical companies according to their ability to make their pharmaceutical drugs more available, affordable, accessible and acceptable in 106 low- to middle-income countries. The biennial index aims to stimulate industry to improve access in developing countries, to show the activities of their peers, and allow them, governments, investors, civil society, patient organisations and academia to gather and form a common view of how pharmaceutical companies can make further progress.

Ranking
The latest Access to Medicine Index, published in January 2021, ranked the top 20 pharmaceutical companies as follows:

History 

The Access to Medicine Index was developed starting in 2004 on the initiative of Dutch entrepreneur Wim Leereveld. After years of working with the pharmaceutical industry, he concluded that simply "naming and shaming" the industry did not do enough to encourage pharmaceutical companies to play their part in improving access to medicine in the developing world. Leereveld noticed that there were many different (and sometimes conflicting) opinions about what the pharmaceutical industry should be doing with regard to access to medicine, but that there was no tool to recognise good practice within the pharmaceutical industry and no framework for collective dialogue surrounding this issue. He set out to develop a ranking system that would show which pharmaceutical companies do the most to improve access to medicine and how, and also help stakeholders to collectively define companies' role in increasing access to medicine.

The first Access to Medicine Index was published in 2008, followed by a new index every two years.

Methodology 

The 2017 methodology for the 2018 Access to Medicine Index was published in October 2017.

The Access to Medicine Index uses a weighted analysis to capture and compare data which the companies provide. The framework is constructed along seven areas of focus called "Technical Areas", which cover the range of company business activities considered relevant to access to medicine. Within each area, the index assesses four aspects of company action called "Strategic Pillars": commitments, transparency, performance and innovation.

Scope 

Company scope
The Access to Medicine Index ranks 20 of the world's largest originator (research-based) pharmaceutical companies, based on market capitalisation and the relevance of their product portfolios to diseases in the developing world. One unlisted company, Boehringer Ingelheim, is also included since it meets the size and portfolio relevance criteria.

In 2008 and 2010, the Access to Medicine Index also measured companies engaged exclusively in the production of generic drugs. Based on feedback from the 2011 stakeholder consultations, these companies were excluded from the 2012 Index and subsequent iterations. The Access to Medicine Foundation stated that it recognised that these companies play a significant role in access to medicine, particularly in low- and middle-income countries.

Geographic scope

The Access to Medicine Index focuses on low and middle income countries, based on World Bank and United Nations classifications measuring economic advancement, human development, and relative levels of inequality. The 2018 Index measured developments in a total of 106 countries, including countries considered to be low income and lower-middle income countries by the World Bank, and Least Developed Countries as defined by the United Nations Economic and Social Council. In addition, countries classified as low human development countries and medium human development countries by the UN Human Development Index are included. Finally, based on the UN Inequality-Adjusted Human Development Index, the index includes countries which, while they may have higher measures of development, have comparatively high levels of socio-economic inequality.

Disease scope

The Access to Medicine Index covers a range of diseases based on their aggregate global disease burden and their relevance to pharmaceutical interventions, in accordance with non-age-weighted WHO Disability Adjusted Life Years (DALY) data. Those diseases for which pharmaceutical interventions were irrelevant (such as violent death, trauma and snakebites) are excluded. In the 2018 Index, the disease scope consisted of a combination of the following:

 The top 11 communicable diseases based on DALYs from the WHO Global Health Observatory 2015 DALY Estimates
 The top 10 non-communicable diseases based on DALYs from the WHO Global Health Observatory 2015 DALY Estimates
 20 of the WHO Neglected Tropical Diseases
 10 maternal and neonatal health conditions identified by Every Woman Every Child. In addition, the index captures activity on contraceptives.
12 priority pathogens from the 2017 WHO priority pathogens list. 
17 cancers with high disease burdens based on data from the WHO Global Cancer Observatory. 19 cancers with relevant products on the 2017 WHO Model List of Essential Medicines are in scope for technical areas relating to pricing, patenting and donations. Nine cancers are in both sets.

Product type scope

To reflect the range of available product types for prevention, diagnosis and treatment of diseases, the index maintains a broad product type scope which draws closely from definitions provided by the G-Finder Report.

Reception 

Since its inception, the Access to Medicine Index has progressed to be a frequently cited and "authoritative"  benchmark for pharmaceutical companies with regard to their access to medicine initiatives. In addition to global media outlets reporting on the Access to Medicine Index and its findings, significant coverage includes:

 In July 2008, Bill Gates mentioned the Access to Medicine Index in an interview with Time magazine as an example of an incentive that works to give businesses credit for what they are already doing to address the challenges of access to medicine in developing countries.
 In 2010 Paul Hunt, the former UN special rapporteur on the right to health, described the index as a way to measure the pharmaceutical industry's progress in line with human rights obligations. 
 A 2010 UBS report called the index a tool for investors to assess access to medicine specifically and, where necessary, separately from corporate social responsibility frameworks.
 Since 2008, the Access to Medicine Index has been repeatedly cited in scientific journals such as the British Medical Journal, The Lancet and The Pharmaceutical Journal.
 Data from the 2014 Index was used in a study of access to hepatitis C medicines in the Bulletin of the World Health Organization.
 A 2014 Deutsche Bank report on pharmaceutical industry investment in malaria and neglected tropical diseases mentioned the index.

Criticism

The results of the Access to Medicine Index are largely based on company data provided by the pharmaceutical companies themselves. Self-reported data does carry with it an inherent risk, but the Access to Medicine Index also uses dependable external sources to verify data provided by the companies wherever possible. Additionally, it is in companies' best interest to be as forthcoming as possible, as they are a) rated by the index on their degree of transparency and b) rated on their performance every two years, so that failures to meet their commitments and/or inconsistencies over time are likely to be uncovered. Besides, as drug access is only one dimension of the Corporate Social Responsibility (CSR) within the pharmaceutical industry, it would not be reasonable to evaluate the CSR practices of pharmaceutical companies only using this index.

References

External links 
2018 Access to Medicine Index 
2016 Access to Medicine Index
2016 Access to Medicine Index - Methodology 2015
2014 Access to Medicine Index
Methodology Report 2013 for the 2014 Access to Medicine Index
2012 Access to Medicine Index
2012 Methodology Report- Stakeholder Review
2010 Access to Medicine Index
2010 Methodology & Stakeholder Review
2008 Access to Medicine Index
2008 Industry & Stakeholder Review

Pharmaceutical industry